William Morgan (died 1649) was a Welsh lawyer and politician who sat in the House of Commons from 1628 to 1649.

Morgan was the son of Llewellyn Morgan of Ystradfellte. He was called to the bar. He purchased the estate of Dderw in Llyswen. He was a Recorder of Brecon from 1637, and was King's attorney in South Wales until his death.

In 1628, Morgan was elected a Member of Parliament for Monmouth Boroughs. He was later elected in April 1640 for Breconshire in the Short Parliament, re-elected for Breconshire for the Long Parliament in November 1640 and sat until his death in 1649. In February 1649, information was laid against him that he had supported the Royalist cause in the Civil War, raising money and arms for the king and sitting in the King's parliament in Oxford. 
 
Morgan died in 1649 and was buried in the Priory Church, Brecon.

Morgan married Elizabeth Morgan, daughter of Sir William Morgan of Tredegar. His son William was High Sheriff in 1655. He was the father-in-law of William Morgan (of Machen and Tredegar).

Family

References

 

1582 births
1649 deaths
17th-century Welsh poets
Members of the Parliament of England (pre-1707) for constituencies in Wales
English MPs 1640 (April)
English MPs 1640–1648
English MPs 1628–1629
Year of birth uncertain
17th-century Welsh lawyers